Leila Cobo is a Colombian journalist, writer, novelist, pianist and television show host. She is noted for her coverage of Latin music for Billboard where she is currently the Chief Content Officer for Latin Music and Español, overseeing the brand's coverage and development of Latin music across all its platforms. These include billboard.com and billboardespanol.com, which Cobo launched, podcasts and video.  A Fulbright Scholar with degrees in music and communications, Cobo also contributes frequently to other publications and speaks frequently at conferences and universities around the world.  She also an acclaimed author and novelist who has published five books, including two novels and most recently, a history of Latin music,  "Decoding Despacito," which was selected as a New York Times Summer Read pick.  
Prior to Billboard, she was the pop music critic for the Miami Herald and a reporter for the Los Angeles Times. Also known for her lifestyle writing, Cobo also served as director of content for Nexos, American Airlines'  Spanish and Portuguese in-flight magazine.  
As an author, Cobo has published two novels ("Tell Me Something True" and "The Second Time We Met," both on Grand Central Books/Hatchette). Her most recent book, "Decoding Despacito: An Oral History of Latin Music" (Penguin), published in English and Spanish, has been widely acclaimed as an essential guide to the history of Latin music. She also published a musical biography on the late Jenni Rivera, also in English and Spanish ("La Increible Historia de Una Mariposa Guerrera" (n Penguin) and a book on the Latin music industry ("Apunta a las estrellas,") also on Penguin.  She also collaborated with Puerto Rican star Ednita Nazario in her memoir "Una Vida," which was published in 2017 by Penguin.

Personal life and music career
Cobo was born in Cali, Colombia and is of Lebanese descent. She earned a bachelor's degree in journalism from Bogota's Javeriana University. She got her second degree in piano performance from Manhattan School of Music in New York City and concertized extensively. Cobo had an active career as a classical pianist in her home country, performing as a soloist with Colombia's Symphony Orchestra (Orquesta Sinfonica de Colombia), Orquesta Sinfonica de Antioquia in Medellin and Orquesta Sinfonica del Valle in Cali, among others.  She was also featured multiple times in Biblioteca Luis Angel Arango's concert series, performing as a soloist and in chamber groups. Cobo's last performance as a soloist was performing Prokofiev's Piano Concerto No. 3 with Orquesta Sinfonica del Valle. Although she would later perform sporadically, she dedicated herself to her communications career, obtaining a Fulbright Scholarship and getting a degree in Communication management from the USC Annenberg School for Communication and Journalism at the University of Southern California.

Career at Billboard
Cobo serves Chief Content Officer for Latin and Español for Billboard in charge of overseeing the brand's Latin music coverage and programming. In her position, she is in charge of programming  Billboard's yearly Latin Music Conference & Awards, one of the Latin Music Industry's biggest events, and hosts its "Q&A's" with Latin music's stars. Cobo also helped launch billboardenespanol.com, the brand's Spanish-language site and has been instrumental in expanding Billboard's coverage of Latin music which now includes an extensive digital component as well as videos and podcasts. As an expert in Latin music, she has been a panelist in numerous conferences, including BAFIM in Buenos Aires, Vina del Mar in Chile, LAMC, Bogota Music Market, among many others.
Cobo has also written liner notes for major album releases, including for artists such as Shakira, Chayanne, Ricky Martin and Julio Iglesias.

The Writer
Cobo published her first novel - Tell Me Something True on  Grand Central Publishing (a division of Hachette Book Group) in 2009. It received generally favorable reviews and Cobo was named a "New Voice" by Ingram Literary Magazine and her novel was named one of the Top 10 Hispanic books of the year by the Society of Latino and Hispanic Writers of San Antonio  The novel achieved critical  and commercial success. Tell Me Something True has since been released in 2 other languages, Italian and German.

Cobo's second novel titled, "The Second Time We Met," was released Feb. 29, 2012, also on Grand Central, receiving favorable reviews from AP and Reuter's among others. The book was nominated for a Latino Book Award in Best Popular Fiction.

Cobo's third book is a biography of the recently deceased Jenni Rivera. Titled  "Jenni Rivera - La Increible Vida de una Mariposa Guerrera", the book was released March 20, 2013 on CA Press/Penguin and was the top-selling Spanish language book in the U.S.—following the Bible—for 10 weeks. It was the top-selling Spanish language biography in the U.S. for five straight weeks, according to Nielsen BookScan. The book was released in its English-language version April 23. On April 16, 2014, Cobo will release "Apunta a Las Estrellas" (Aim For the Stars), an inspirational guide for people seeking a career in music.

In 2017, Cobo collaborated with Puerto Rican singer Ednita Nazario in her widely acclaimed memoir, "Una Vida."

Cobo's latest book is "Decoding Despacito: An Oral History of Latin Music" (Penguin), which was published in Spanish and English and also released as an audio book.

Cobo is also an author of the Billboard Illustrated Encyclopedia of Music, and  her work was featured in the book of essays  "Quinceañera."

Television
Cobo hosted and produced six seasons of the show "Estudio Billboard", which aired on Fox Life and V-Me. The show featured reviews and interviews with Latin music artists.

Other Work
Cobo's highly regarded interviews with Latin artists can be seen on Billboard.com and on Billboard's YouTube channel as well as on Reach TV. She has also been a part of the Los Angeles Times staff, as well as the pop music critic for the Miami Herald. Simultaneous with her work in Billboard, for six years she was also the content director of Nexos, the Spanish/Portuguese in-flight magazine of American Airlines. 

She also contributes frequently to other publications like Latina Magazine, AARP and more, and has written liner notes for albums by numerous Latin stars, including  Ricky Martin, Shakira(Credits of Shakira album), Julio Iglesias and Selena .

Awards and honors
Cobo is a recipient of the prestigious Fulbright Scholarship, which allowed her to obtain her master's degree from the University of Southern California's Annenberg School of Communication.

She has been decorated with multiple awards, including 2017's Leading Latin Lady, given by the Latin Academy of Recording Arts and Sciences; the TJ Martell Trailblazer Award given in 2019; and the LAMC's 2020 “Wonder Women of Latin Music” award.

In March, 2014, Cobo was named Woman of the Year by Latino Show Magazine in New York. She's also been named one of 12 South Florida Hispanic Women of Distinction (2012) and in 2008 she was recognized as one of the Most Influential People in Latin music by magazines like Gatopardo, and Revista Fuchsia. That same year, Ocean Drive Magazine, named her one of its "Power Brokers".  In 2007, she was the recipient of the Nielsen President's Award  for Excellence and the journalistic excellence award from Premios Orquidea, which is given to Colombians with an outstanding career abroad. She was presented with the Leading Ladies of Entertainment accolade by the Latin Recording Academy in 2017.

References

External links
Life Magazine
Leila Cobo Official Site

Living people
Colombian women writers
Colombian journalists
Colombian women journalists
Colombian magazine editors
Colombian television personalities
Colombian musicians
People from Cali
USC Annenberg School for Communication and Journalism alumni
Women magazine editors
Year of birth missing (living people)
Colombian people of Lebanese descent